A Visit is a Canadian animated short film, directed by Parissa Mohit and released in 2018. The film centres on a child visiting a woman, whose interactions with each other and the world around them become increasingly phantasmagorical.

The film premiered at the Oberhausen International Short Film Festival

It received a Canadian Screen Award nomination for Best Animated Short Film at the 7th Canadian Screen Awards in 2019.

References

External links
 

2018 films
2010s animated short films
Canadian animated short films
2010s Canadian films